Trabolgan (meaning 'strand of Bolgan') is a self catering holiday village located in the civil parish of Trabolgan, County Cork in the Republic of Ireland and is situated on a  site which was a former country estate.

History

Pontin's Trabolgan
Trabolgan first opened in 1948 by British holiday camp company, Pontin's. Pontin's built over 100 chalets, a dance hall and an outdoor swimming pool, and the development was initially successful at attracting British holiday makers.

Scoil na nÓg
Trabolgan was not successful in the longer term however, and it was converted into a boy's boarding school, Scoil na nÓg, operated by Gaedhealachas Teo from 1959 to 1973.

Trabolgan Holiday Village
In 1975, the Trabolgan estate was purchased by a Dutch Coal and Metal Industry Pension Fund and a small holiday development consisting of 30 houses, bar and clubhouse was opened in 1980, catering mainly for the Continental market. The decision to extend the village to include a Main Centre and a wide range of facilities was taken in 1983 and building was completed in 1985. The site was put up for sale in 2000, and purchased by Trevor Hemmings in 2002.

See also
 Imokilly, location within Ireland
 Trabolgan, a racehorse owned by Trevor Hemmings

References

External links
 Trabolgan Holiday Village homepage

Holiday villages
Resorts in the Republic of Ireland
Tourist attractions in County Cork